Anthony Paulino (born 8 June 1994 in Lower Astumbo, Dededo) is a Guamanian international footballer, who currently plays for the Washington Huskies soccer team.

Career 
He attended the Father Duenas Memorial School and played for the soccer team of the Friars. In 2010 Paulino moved to LA and played for the Salesian High School (Los Angeles). Paulino played in 2012 during his senior year of Salesian High, for the Crossfire Premier soccer team in the U.S. Soccer Development Academy.

After his graduating in 2012 from the High School, signed for his studium with the University of Washington.

International 
The former Guam national under-16 Captain, made his first appearance for the Guam national football team in 2012.

References

Guamanian footballers
Guam international footballers
1994 births
People from Dededo
Association football defenders
Washington Huskies men's soccer players
Living people